Jonas Björkman and Max Mirnyi were the defending champions, but lost in the quarterfinals this year.

Bob Bryan and Mike Bryan won the title, defeating Martin Damm and Leander Paes 6–7(7–9), 6–3, [10–7] in the final.

Seeds

  Jonas Björkman /  Max Mirnyi (quarterfinals)
  Bob Bryan /  Mike Bryan (champions)
  Mark Knowles /  Daniel Nestor (quarterfinals)
  Paul Hanley /  Kevin Ullyett (quarterfinals)
  Fabrice Santoro /  Nenad Zimonjić (semifinal)
  Martin Damm /  Leander Paes (final)
  Jonathan Erlich /  Andy Ram (first round)
  Lukáš Dlouhý /  Pavel Vízner (first round)

Draw

Final

Section 1

Section 2

External links
Draw

2007 Sony Ericsson Open
Sony Ericsson Open